Orthocomotis alshiana is a species of moth of the family Tortricidae. It is found in Morona-Santiago Province, Ecuador.

The wingspan is 24 mm. The ground colour of the forewings is whitish, dotted and sprinkled with brown. The dorsum is suffused with brownish with orange, green and brown scales. The hindwings are greyish brown with paler spots.

Etymology
The species name refers to the locality where the holotype was collected.

References

Moths described in 2007
Orthocomotis
Lepidoptera of Ecuador
Endemic fauna of Ecuador
Tortricidae of South America